Peptidyl-glycine alpha-amidating monooxygenase is an enzyme that catalyzes the conversion of glycine amides to amides and glyoxylate.

The enzyme is involved in the biosynthesis of many signaling peptides and some fatty acid amides. 

In humans, the enzyme is encoded by the PAM gene. This transformation is achieved by conversion of a prohormone to the corresponding amide (C(O)NH2).  This enzyme is the only known pathway for generating peptide amides, which renders the peptide more hydrophilic.

Function 
This gene encodes a multifunctional protein. It has two enzymatically active domains with catalytic activities - peptidylglycine alpha-hydroxylating monooxygenase (PHM) and peptidyl-alpha-hydroxyglycine alpha-amidating lyase (PAL). These catalytic domains work sequentially to catalyze neuroendocrine peptides to active alpha-amidated products. The reaction pathway catalyzed by PAM is accessed via quantum tunneling and substrate preorganization. Multiple alternatively spliced transcript variants encoding different isoforms have been described for this gene, but some of their full-length sequences are not yet known.

The PHM subunit effects hydroxylation of an O-terminal glycine residue:
peptide-C(O)NHCH2CO2−  +  O2  +  2 [H]   →   peptide-C(O)NHCH(OH)CO2−  +  H2O
Involving hydroxylation of a hydrocarbon by O2, this process relies on a copper cofactor.  Dopamine beta-hydroxylase, also a copper-containing enzyme, effects a similar transformation.

The PAL subunit then completes the conversion, by catalyzing elimination from the hydroxylated glycine:
peptide-C(O)NHCH(OH)CO2−   →   peptide-C(O)NH2 +   CH(O)CO2−
The eliminated coproduct is glyoxylate, written above as CH(O)CO2−.

In insects 
Insect PαAMs are responsive to O concentrations and depends upon Cu. Simpson et al 2015 finds insect PαAMs to respond to hypoxia by regulating the activity of several peptide hormones. They find PαAM to probably be an important part of neuroendocrine responses to hypoxia.

References

Further reading